Jalna district (Marathi pronunciation: [d͡ʒaːlnaː]) is an administrative district in the state of Maharashtra in western India. Jalna town is the district headquarters. The district is part of Aurangabad division.

Officer

Members of Parliament

Raosaheb Danve (BJP) 
Sanjay Haribhau Jadhav (SHS)

Guardian Minister

list of Guardian Minister

District Magistrate/Collector

list of District Magistrate / Collector

Geography
The district is situated in central Maharashtra, in the north of the Marathwada region—one of eight districts—as part Aurangabad division, and is bounded on the north by Jalgaon district, on the east by Parbhani district and Buldhana district, on the south by Beed district and on the west by Aurangabad district.

The range of geographical latitudes and longitudes of the district is from 19.01' N to 21.03'N and from 75.04'E to 76.04'E, with gently to moderately sloping topography. The Northern part of the district is occupied by the Ajanta and Satmala hill ranges.

Rivers and lakes
The Godavari River flows along the southern boundary of the district, from west to east. The Purna River, one of the major tributaries of the Godavari, also flows through the district. The Dudhana, the principal tributary of the Purna, and the Kelana and the Girija, also tributaries of the Purna, as well as the Gulati and the Kundlika—which has been dammed to create the Ghanewadi Reservoir, which provides water to Jalna city—are other rivers draining the district.

History
Archaeological excavations show the district was inhabited in the Stone Age. According to tradition, the region was originally covered with thick jungle. Stories tell of how Rama, Sita and Lakshmana met Agastya at the Godavari in the district.

Buddhism was introducted in Maharashtra during the reign of Ashoka, and the region was under Maurya authority. After the collapse of Maurya authority the region became part of the heartland of the Satavahanas, whose capital was in nearby Prathisthana (now Paithan). The district then fell into the hands of the Chalukyas of Badami in the 6th century. Their rule was replaced by the Rashtrakutas, who ruled the district until the 10th century. Then it was taken by the Western Chalukyas.

In the 12th century, the region became ruled by the Yadava dynasty, who were based in nearby Devagiri and were originally Chalukya feudatories. The Yadavas ruled until 1308, when Khilji general Malik Kafur defeated the Yadavas and annexed their kingdom for Alauddin Khilji. The district remained under Sultanate rule until 1499, when a regional governor declared independence and created the Bahmani Sultanate. In the early 1530s, the Bahmani Sultanate fractured into five states, one of which was the Ahmednagar  Sultanate which Jalna was part of. Jalna became conquered by the Mughal Empire and during Akbar's time, was a jagir which was held for a brief time by Abul Fazl. It continued to be part of the Ahmednagar Subah until the Asaf Jahis declared independence, and Jalna became part of their new state of Hyderabad. In 1728, the Marathas conquered the district, but before 1790 the district returned to the hands of the Nizam.

After India annexed Hyderabad in 1948, it became part of Aurangabad district of Hyderabad State. In 1960, like the rest of Marathwada, Jalna became part of the new state of Maharashtra. On 1 May 1981, the present district was formed from Jalna, Bhokardan, Jafrabad and Ambad talukas of Aurangabad district and Partur taluka of Parbhani district.

Divisions
The district was formed during the term of chief minister Abdul Rehman Antulay. The district is divided into four sub-divisions, Jalna, Partur, Bhokardan and Ambad. These are further divided into eight talukas: Jalna, Ambad, Bhokardan, Badnapur, Ghansavangi, Partur, Mantha and Jafrabad. There is a total of 970 villages in the district.

The district has five constituencies of Maharashtra State Vidhan Sabha ( Legislative Assembly):
 Partur (Vidhan Sabha constituency)
 Ghansawangi (Vidhan Sabha constituency)
 Jalna (Vidhan Sabha constituency)
 Badnapur (Vidhan Sabha constituency)
 Bhokardan (Vidhan Sabha constituency)

While Partur and Ghansawangi are part of Parbhani (Lok Sabha constituency), the other three are part of the Jalna (Lok Sabha constituency).

Demographics

According to the 2011 census, Jalna district has a population of 1,959,046, roughly equal to the nation of Lesotho or the US state of New Mexico. This gives it a ranking of 237th in India (out of a total of 640). Its population growth rate over the decade 2001–2011 was 21.84%. Jalna has a sex ratio of 929 females for every 1000 males, and a literacy rate of 73.61%. Scheduled Castes and Scheduled Tribes constitute 13.90% and 2.16% of the population respectively.

At the time of the 2011 Census of India, 76.16% of the population in the district spoke Marathi, 9.16% Urdu, 7.09% Hindi and 4.46% Lambadi as their first language.

Notable people
Badrinarayan Ramulal Barwale – father of the Indian seeds industry, who revolutionised farming practices by producing cheaper and higher-yield seeds in the Marathwada region of India.
 Shantilal Pitti -Founded Jalna’s  First steel factory (SRG )in 1970 under the leadership of Former Prime Minister Indira Gandhi.

See also

 Tourism in Marathwada
 Institute of Mental Health (Erragadda) - Institute was shifted from Jalna To Hyderabad in 1953 after Hyderabad State (1948–56) was formed.

References

External links

 Jalna district official website

 
Districts of Maharashtra
Aurangabad division
Marathwada
1981 establishments in Maharashtra